Kirk Degiorgio, better known as As One, is a British techno producer and DJ. Born in the late 1960s in Stepney, East London, and raised in Suffolk, he started producing music in the early 1990s. He founded the labels A.R.T. Records and Op-Art Records and releases on them as well as B12 Records, R&S Records, New Electronica, and others. His style is a mixture of Detroit-style techno, mixed with funk, soul and jazz fusion. He is one half of The Beauty Room.

Discography

As As One
Reflections (1994)
Celestial Soul (1995)
Reflections on Reflections (1995) (Remix album)
The Art of Prophecy (1997)
Planetary Folklore (1997)
In with Their Arps, and Moogs, and Jazz and Things (1997)
So Far: So Good (2000)
21st Century Soul (2001)
Out of the Darkness (2004)
Elegant Systems (2005)
Planetary Folklore 2 (2006)
Communion (2019)

As Kirk Degiorgio
Check One (1996)
Synthesis (1998)
Two Worlds (2001) (Far Out Recordings)
Sambatek (2013) Far Out Recordings

As The Beauty Room
The Beauty Room (2006)
The Beauty Room II (2012)

References

External links
 Kirk Degiorgio / As One on discogs.com
 
 RBMA Radio On Demand – Sound Obsession – Volume 15 – Electro Special Pt 1 – Kirk Degiorgio (The Beauty Room, As One)
 RBMA Radio On Demand – Sound Obsession – Volume 14 – Stevie Wonder Special Pt.2 – Kirk Degiorgio (The Beauty Room, As One)
 RBMA Radio On Demand – Sound Obsession – Volume 12 – Summer of '67 – Kirk Degiorgio (The Beauty Room, As One)

Year of birth missing (living people)
Living people
English techno musicians
English DJs
English record producers
Ubiquity Records artists
Far Out Recordings artists
Electronic dance music DJs